Richard B. Nowakowski (January 4, 1921 – October 28, 2007) was a member of the Wisconsin State Assembly.

Biography
Nowakowski was born on January 4, 1921, in Milwaukee, Wisconsin. There, he received a religious-based education and attended South Division High School. During and after World War II, he served in the United States Army. Nowakowski died on October 28, 2007.

Political career
Nowakowski was a member of the Assembly during the 1953 and 1955 sessions. Additionally, he was a member of the Milwaukee Common Council from 1950 to 1952 and from 1956 to 1968. He was a Democrat.

References

Politicians from Milwaukee
Democratic Party members of the Wisconsin State Assembly
Wisconsin city council members
Military personnel from Wisconsin
United States Army personnel of World War II
1921 births
2007 deaths
20th-century American politicians
South Division High School alumni